is a railway station on the Joetsu Line in the city of Minamiuonuma, Niigata, Japan, operated by the East Japan Railway Company (JR East).

Lines

Station layout
The station has one ground-level side platform and one ground-level island platform connected by a footbridge; however, one side of the island platform is fenced off and is not in use. The station is staffed.

Platforms

History
The station opened on 18 November 1923. Upon the privatization of Japanese National Railways (JNR) on 1 April 1987, it came under the control of JR East.

Passenger statistics
In fiscal 2017, the station was used by an average of 575 passengers daily (boarding passengers only).

Surrounding area
Minamiuonuma City Shiozawa Office branch (Shiozawa Town office)
Shiozawa primary school
Shiozawa Junior High School
Shiozawa Commercial and Technical High School

References

External links

  

Railway stations in Niigata Prefecture
Railway stations in Japan opened in 1923
Stations of East Japan Railway Company
Jōetsu Line
Minamiuonuma